The AEEB Coach of the Year Award is an annual basketball award that is given by the Spanish Basketball Coaches Association (Spanish: Asociación Española de Entrenadores de Baloncesto (AEEB). It recognizes the best coach of the year in Spain.

The award was established in 1975, and the person recognized as the 'AEEB Coach of the Year' receives the AEEB Coach of the Year trophy, which is named after Antonio Díaz-Miguel. This award is considered the most important one for basketball coaches in Spain, since it is based on votes by other coaches. The top-tier level basketball league in Spain, the Liga ACB, also gives a coach of the year award, the ACB Best Coach award, which has been awarded since the 2007–08 season.

Past winners

Most successful coaches
Below is the list of the most successful coaches, those with 2 or more awards won:

See also
ACB Best Coach

References

External links
AEEB official website 

Spanish sports trophies and awards
Basketball coaching awards
Liga ACB awards
Awards established in 1975
1975 establishments in Spain